Ballyvourney (meaning 'Town of the Beloved', also spelled ) is a Gaeltacht village in southwest County Cork, Ireland. It is a civil parish in the barony of Muskerry West, and is also an ecclesiastical parish in the Roman Catholic Diocese of Cloyne. Ballyvourney is part of the Cork North-West Dáil Constituency.

Location and access
The village stretches along the N22 road which links Cork city (to the southeast) with Killarney (to the northwest). The nearest large town is Macroom, while the nearest international airport is Cork Airport. As of 2015, there has been a proposal to construct 22 km of dual carriageway from Coolcour at the eastern side of Macroom, bypassing Macroom to the north and finishing west of Ballyvourney. Bus Éireann Expressway Route 40 between Rosslare Europort and Tralee runs through Ballyvourney.

Physical geography and political subdivisions
The village lies on the River Sullane:<blockquote>"The river Sullane has its source in the parish, in the mountains bordering on the county of Kerry, and after intersecting it longitudinally pursues an eastern course through the parish of Clondrohid to the town of Macroom, to the east of which, at the distance of a mile, it discharges itself into the river Lee;"<ref>Lewis, A Topographical Dictionary of Ireland", 1837, Ballyvourney</ref></blockquote>
In this part of Cork, the rivers mainly drain longitudinally from west to east; this is true of the Lee and the Munster Blackwater. Between these rivers lies the valley of the Sullane. To the north of the parish,  the Derrynasaggart Mountains and the Boggeragh Mountains separate the valley from the Blackwater valley. To the south, the upland area of Reananerree and the Shehies separate it from the Lee valley. The surrounding district of Muskerry straddles the counties of Cork and Kerry. The highest point in the parish, at 694m, is Mullaghanish located just northeast of the village.

Ballyvourney is one of the 24 civil parishes in the barony of Muskerry West. The barony is the namesake of Baron Muskerry. There are 47 townlands in the civil parish.

The parish lies in the Rural District of Macroom, in the electoral division (ED) of An Sliabh Riabhach. Other EDs within that rural district include Aghinagh, Aglish, Béal Átha an Ghaorthaidh, Cannaway, Ceann Droma, Cill na Martra, Claonráth, Clondrohid, Clonmoyle, Doire Fhínín, Gort na Tiobratan, Greenville, Inchigeelagh, Kilberrihert, Macloneigh, Magourney, Mashanaglass, Na hUláin, Rahalisk and Warrenscourt. The ED is part of the Cork North-West constituency for elections to Dáil Éireann.

History
Historically, the people of Múscraige had the Corcu Loígde as their overlords. However, they switched allegiance to the Eóganachta and facilitated their rise to power as Kings of Munster. In "Griffith's Valuation of Ireland (1837)", 548 unique records are recorded in the civil parish. Of these, the top 11 surnames accounted for over half over the entries. The townlands with the most recorded surnames, from greatest to least, are: Coolavokig, Derrylahan, Slievereagh, Ballymakeery, Gortnatubbud, Dangansallagh, Derreenaling, Knockanure, Milleeny and Coolea.

During the Irish War of Independence, the IRA ambushed a British rations lorry just south of Ballyvourney on 18 July 1921, resulting in the deaths of two British soldiers, including James Airy.

Tourism and culture

 Language 
Today, the district gives its name to the Muskerry Gaeltacht which is an officially designated Irish-speaking area. While the inhabitants of the area know Irish well, English has been the predominant household and community language since the 1920s. According to the 2016 Census about 21% of the population of the "An Sliabh Riabhach" electoral division (where Ballyvourney is located) speak Irish on a daily basis outside the education system. The area's Gaeltacht status draws visitors—as does its architectural heritage.

 Religion 
The town is associated with Saint Gobnait and is the site of her abbey, cells and St. Gobnait's Well. Her Pattern Day, 11 February, is still celebrated by the community. During a Mass at the well, everyone takes water from it. According to legend, Gobnait was born in County Clare in the 6th century. Fleeing from Clare, she took refuge in the Aran Islands, where she encountered an angel who instructed her to go on a journey. The angel told her that when she came upon nine white deer, that would be her place. Travelling south, she came to Clondrohid where she found three white deer. She followed them to Killeens, Ballymakeera where she saw six more. When she found the nine white deer in Baile Bhuirne, she stayed and founded a convent. The remains of the convent are still the locus of pilgrimage, which while it is ostensibly Christian, may well be pagan in origin.

The abbey contains an example of a Sheela na Gig and there are a number of stone circles, stone rows and fulachtaí fia in the area.

 Music and dance 
The composer Seán Ó Riada is buried in the cemetery there.

The sean-nós singer Elizabeth Cronin spent her whole life in the area.

The village gives its name to an Irish dance figure—the Baile Bhuirne SetBallyvourney is the home of Ionad Cultúrtha, a regional cultural centre for the traditional and contemporary arts. It holds many music and visual art events.

Amenities and attractions
St. Gobnet's Wood is an old 30 ha woodland mainly planted in old Sessile Oak.

The local national school is called Scoil Aban Naofa and is named after Aban, a saint associated with the area.

The secondary school, Coláiste Ghobnatan, was formed in 1989 following the merger of Coláiste Iosagáin and Scoil Ghobnatan. According to the school principal, Breandán O Lionáird, "The College is named in honour of Saint Gobnait, patron Saint of Baile Bhúirne and indeed we place all our work under her protection.". The grounds of "Coláiste Íosagáin", a former De La Salle college, was where Song for a Raggy Boy was filmed.

The film The Wind That Shakes the Barley'' was also filmed in nearby locations.

The bars and restaurants in the village are "The Mills Inn", "The Abbey Hotel", "The Hibernian", "The Crúiscín Lán"and "The Village Takeaway & Diner". The Mills Inn is built on the site of the former police barracks.

Cultural events include:
 Patron Saint's Day, 11 February.
 Whit Sunday feast day.
 Ballyvourney - Coolea Annual Show, College Field.
 Cultural & Heritage Centre which also holds educational programmes and traditional music concerts.
 Irish language courses organised by Gael-Linn in the Irish College.

Economy
Employment opportunities in Ballyvourney range from agricultural, industrial to hospitality sectors. Údarás na Gaeltachta provide grants for businesses, many of which are situated in Ballyvourney's industrial estate.

Sport
The Senior Gaelic football club, Naomh Abán GAA, has a number of championship titles to its name. Anthony Lynch, a native of Ballyvourney and a player on the local football team also plays for the Cork senior football team.

The local association football (soccer) club, Sullane F.C., fields teams in the West Cork league in senior and underage divisions.

See also

 List of towns and villages in Ireland
 List of civil parishes of County Cork

References

Civil parishes of County Cork
Gaeltacht places in County Cork
Gaeltacht towns and villages
Tourist attractions in County Cork
Towns and villages in County Cork